Duke of Santisteban del Puerto is a hereditary title in the Peerage of Spain accompanied by the dignity of Grandee, granted in 1738 by Philip V to Manuel de Benavides, 10th Count of Santisteban del Puerto and Brigadier of the Spanish Army.

The title makes reference to the town of Santisteban del Puerto in Jaén, and was elevated from a Countship granted in 1473 to a Dukedom.

Dukes of Santisteban del Puerto

Manuel de Benavides y Aragón, 1st Duke of Santisteban del Puerto
Antonio de Benavides y de la Cueva, 2nd Duke of Santisteban del Puerto
Joaquina de Benavides y Pacheco, 3rd Duchess of Santisteban del Puerto
Luis Joaquín Fernández de Córdoba y Benavides, 4th Duke of Santisteban del Puerto
Luis Tomás Fernández de Córdoba y Ponce de León, 5th Duke of Santisteban del Puerto
Luis María Fernández de Córdoba y Pérez de Barradas, 6th Duke of Santisteban del Puerto
Luis Jesús Fernández de Córdoba y Salabert, 7th Duke of Santisteban del Puerto
Victoria Eugenia Fernández de Córdoba, 8th Duchess of Santisteban del Puerto
Luis de Medina y Fernández de Córdoba, 9th Duke of Santisteban del Puerto
Victoria de Medina y Conradi, 10th Duchess of Santisteban del Puerto

See also
List of dukes in the peerage of Spain
List of current Grandees of Spain

References

Bibliography
 

Dukedoms of Spain
Grandees of Spain
Lists of dukes
Lists of Spanish nobility